Xenocytaea daviesae is a jumping spider.

Name
Named in honor of Valerie Todd Davies, a Salticid specialist from Queensland Museum, Australia.

Description
Xenocytaea daviesae males are about 3 mm long, with females slightly more than 4 mm.

Distribution
Xenocytaea daviesae is only known from Viti Levu, Fiji.

References
 Berry, J.W., Beatty, J.A. & Proszynski, J. (1998). Salticidae of the Pacific Islands. III. Distribution of Seven Genera, with Description of Nineteen New Species and Two New Genera. Journal of Arachnology 26(2):149-189. PDF

Salticidae
Endemic fauna of Fiji
Spiders of Fiji
Spiders described in 1998